Dayana Garroz is a Venezuelan actress, best known for her recurring role as Ámbar Maldonado in the Telemundo's series El Señor de los Cielos. Although previously had notable characters in series as Perro amor (2010), El rostro de la venganza (2012), and Dueños del paraíso. (2015). In March 2021 Garroz became a US citizen.

Career 
Garroz at age 15 she entered a talent representation agency and that was when she began to make commercials, parades and participated in the 2001 Chica a beauty pageant. In 2009 she emigrated to the United States. Subsequently she moved to Miami where she debuted on television in the telenovela Gata Salvaje.

Filmography

Stage 
 Estelas del narco (2018)

References

External links 
 

Living people
Venezuelan telenovela actresses
Venezuelan female models
21st-century Venezuelan actresses
Hispanic and Latino American female models
Year of birth missing (living people)
21st-century American women